This is a list of Dutch battleships of the period 1894-1944. Also considered in the list are shortened versions of battleships, coastal defense ships (sometimes also called coastal defense battleships).

Evertsen (1894) - BU 1914
Piet Hein (1894) - Discarded 1914
Kortenaer (1894) - Discarded 1920

Koningin Regentes (1900) - Discarded 1920
De Ruyter (1901) - Discarded 1923
Hertog Hendrik (1902) - Hulked 1945
Marten Harpertszoon Tromp  (1904) - BU 1932
Jacob Van Heemskerck (1906) - Hulked 1948
De Zeven Provincien (1909) - Sunk 1942, salvaged by Japan and recommissioned, sunk 1943
? class (not built)
6 ships?

Dreadnoughts
1913 proposal (none begun)
 (up to 9 ships planned)

Battlecruisers
Design 1047 (none begun)
 (3 planned)

See also
List of battleships
List of cruisers of the Netherlands
List of monitors of the Netherlands
List of ships of the Royal Netherlands Navy

Netherlands
Naval ships of the Netherlands
Netherlands